National Tertiary Route 727, or just Route 727 (or ) is a National Road Route of Costa Rica, located in the Alajuela province.

Description
In Alajuela province the route covers Alajuela canton (San José, San Isidro, Tambor districts).

References

Highways in Costa Rica